"Your Woman" is a song by British one-man band White Town. It was released in January 1997 as the lead single from the album Women in Technology. It features a muted trumpet line taken from a 1932 recording of "My Woman" by Lew Stone and his Monseigneur Band. The song peaked at  1 on the UK Singles Chart. Outside the United Kingdom, the single reached No. 1 in Iceland, Israel and Spain, peaked within the top 10 on the charts of at least 12 countries, and reached No. 23 in the United States.

In the booklet of their 1999 album 69 Love Songs, The Magnetic Fields' frontman Stephin Merritt described "Your Woman" as one of his "favourite pop songs of the last few years." In 2010, the song was named the 158th best track of the 1990s by Pitchfork.

Background and writing
Jyoti Prakash Mishra, White Town's sole member and the writer of "Your Woman", had garnered some notoriety within the United Kingdom's underground music scene in the years leading up to the song's mainstream release. In 1997, the song was heard by Mark Radcliffe (a BBC Radio 1 presenter at the time) who played it, helping Mishra gain much recognition in a short time.

Mishra has stated that the lyrics could stem from or be related to multiple situations. He says "When I wrote it, I was trying to write a pop song that had more than one perspective. Although it's written in the first person, the character behind that viewpoint isn't necessarily what the casual listener would expect".

Mishra wrote that the themes of the song include: "Being a member of an orthodox Trotskyist/Marxist movement. Being a straight guy in love with a lesbian. Being a gay guy in love with a straight man. Being a straight girl in love with a lying, two-timing, fake-arse Marxist. The hypocrisy that results when love and lust get mixed up with highbrow ideals." Mishra admitted that being signed to a major label (EMI) did not allow him to express creative control, and the loss of his anonymity due to the song's popularity drove him "mad".

The '>Abort, Retry, Fail?_' message that appeared on some inlay cards was explained by the artist: "Well, this cheerful message became a kind of shibboleth for me and sort-of characterises what's been going on for me the last few years." The song was created using free MIDI sequencing software for the Atari ST and a cheap multitrack cassette tape recorder.

Composition
J'na Jefferson of Billboard summarized the song's production as a juxtaposition of the sampled track's ("My Woman" by Lew Stone), "despondent sound with upbeat, enduring energy", which Mishra said was inspired by the 1970s BBC drama-comedy series Pennies From Heaven. He labeled it "alt-pop", adding that it combines the Bowlly sample with "George Clinton-style funk from the '70s, Depeche Mode-inspired '80s electro pop, and '90s boom-bap hip-hop."

The song's lyrics contain various perspectives about love and relationships, and is, according to Mishra, a "flip" of Lew Stone vocalist Al Bowlly's original "anti-woman" theme. Regarding the song's concept and the perspective of which it is sang from, Mishra said "When you love somebody, it's not logical, it's not rational, and you think, 'This is ridiculous, I can never be with you, I can never be the person you need, why am I even feeling these feelings?' So, I was trying to write from all these different sides… I wanted people to go, 'this is catchy,' and sing it, but then be like, 'What the hell?' at the same time".

Critical reception
Larry Flick from Billboard wrote that "the lines dividing electronic dance music and hip-hop are blurred on this instantly infectious ditty, actually, the real creative inspiration here appears to come from "Good Times" and other classic hits by Chic. It's evident in the jangly guitar licks and the bounce of the backbeat." He added that "those with no historical reference will probably find the distorted vocals and mind-numbing horn samples good fun." Stuart Millar from The Guardian described the song as "a blend of indie-pop, with an introduction from a trumpet piece taken from a 1920s record." A reviewer from Music Week rated it five out of five, picking it as Single of the Week. The reviewer noted that it has already won Radio One support "and it's easy to see why. With a vocal reverberating somewhere between The Buggles and Stephen Duffy, this instantly catchy pop synth dance track is simplicity at its irresistible best." Dave Fawbert from ShortList said, "It’s one of those classic, not-quite-sure-why-it-works-but-it-definitely-does tunes, so lo-fi that the song was actually  on an Atari ST." Gina Morris from Smash Hits commented that "what's cool is that he recorded his debut single in his own room and then watched it go to number one."

Music video
The accompanying music video for "Your Woman" was produced in black and white silent film style. Most of the outdoor scenes were filmed in Derby.

In the video, there are numerous elements of acting, cinematography and editing that suggest an old fashioned film style. The exaggerated gestures of Chloé Treend, the hat wearing woman, helpless and fearful, and those of her quick tempered lover hint at the acting style from 1920s expressionist films. The ostensive metaphors, such as the use of hypnosis on the woman by the man or the recurring shots of crossroad signs bearing names of romantic relationship related attitudes, remind of the 1920s and 1930s efforts to express subjectivism in film.

The use of circular masks, as to emphasise focal points or for a mere elegant look, also belongs to the aforementioned period. At the point where the woman first enters the man's bedroom and in the final rope scene, match cuts are used in a manner resemblant of that from silent experimental films. Mishra can be seen for brief moments on television screens in the background.

There is also a scene where the woman closes the door on the man's arm, as she tries to escape from his advances. This is a direct reference to scene from Salvador Dalí and Luis Buñuel's surrealist film  (1928).

Influence and legacy
In the booklet of their 1999 album 69 Love Songs, The Magnetic Fields' frontman Stephin Merritt described "Your Woman" as one of his "favourite pop songs of the last few years."

Pitchfork named it the 158th best track of the 1990s in 2010.

Slant Magazine listed it at No. 72 in their ranking of "The 100 Best Singles of the 1990s" in 2011, writing, "A one-hit wonder whose other material totally justifies that status, White Town stumbled into a moment of sheer brilliance on "Your Woman", a single that married a fucked-up horn sample to a funk rhythm section straight out of Prince's playbook. The sheer catchiness of the song's arrangement got some adventurous radio programmers on board, but it was the say-what-now gender politics of the song's lyrics that proved to be most compelling. Hearing Jyoti Mishra's plaintive tenor croon, "I guess what they say is true/I could never be the right kind of girl for you/I could never be your woman", remains one of the most subversive moments in '90s pop."

Track listings

 UK and Australian CD single
 "Your Woman" – 4:18
 "Give Me Some Pain" – 4:23
 "Theme for a Mid-Afternoon Game Show" – 2:48
 "Theme for a Late-Night Documentary About the Dangers of Drug Abuse" – 6:08

 UK cassette single and European CD single
 "Your Woman" – 4:18
 "Give Me Some Pain" – 4:23

 Italian 12-inch single
A1. "Your Woman" (The Fights 2000 mix)
B1. "Your Woman"
B2. "Give Me Some Pain"

 US CD and cassette single
 "Your Woman" – 4:18
 "Theme for a Late-Night Documentary About the Dangers of Drug Abuse" – 6:08

Charts

Weekly charts

Year-end charts

Certifications

Release history

Tyler James version

British singer songwriter Tyler James released a cover of the song. It was released as the third and final single from his debut studio album, The Unlikely Lad (2005). It was released as a digital download in the United Kingdom on 22 August 2005. The song peaked at No. 60 on the UK Singles Chart.

Track listings

Charts

Release history

Princess Chelsea version

New Zealand musician Princess Chelsea released a cover of the song in 2009. It was released as her debut, non-album single through digital download.

Other covers
 Finnish band Cats on Fire covered the song in 2010, on their album Dealing in Antiques.
 Australian singer songwriter Darren Hayes performed an acoustic version of the song, in a BBC Radio 2 live session with Jo Whiley in November 2011.
 Australian indie rock band British India performed a version live on radio station Triple J's weekly segment Like a Version in October 2013.
 French electronic act GYM released a cover in 2014.
 German electronic duo Kush Kush sampled the song in "Fight Back With Love Tonight" in 2017, which peaked at No. 1 on the Russian music charts on 23 October 2017.
 White Town released a new version of the song on its twentieth anniversary named "Your Woman 1917", which is recorded with instruments common in 1917.
 Canadian freak pop band Fake Shark released a version in November 2020.
 Australian darkwave/electrocore artist DAMIEN released a version on his debut album Girl in 2021.

Sampling
 Polish hip hop duo Peel Motyff sampled the song in "Nie jest tak źle" in 2001, on their album Sieć.
 Naughty Boy, featuring Wiley and Emeli Sandé, sampled the song in "Never Be Your Woman" in 2010.

See also
 1997 in music
 1997 in British music
 "Love Again" by Dua Lipa, which also sampled "My Woman"

References

1997 songs
1997 singles
2005 singles
Bing Crosby
Black-and-white music videos
Chrysalis Records singles
EMI Records singles
LGBT-related songs
Number-one singles in Iceland
Number-one singles in Israel
Number-one singles in Spain
Songs about infidelity
Tyler James (English musician) songs
Works about Marxism
UK Singles Chart number-one singles
White Town songs